Celebrity Big Brother 2007, also known as Celebrity Big Brother 5, was the fifth series of the British reality television series Celebrity Big Brother. The show followed a total of fourteen celebrity contestants, known as housemates, who were isolated from the outside world for an extended period of time in a custom built House. Each week, one or more of the housemates were eliminated from the competition by public vote and left the House. The last remaining housemate, Shilpa Shetty, was declared the winner.

The series launched on Channel 4 on 3 January 2007 and ended on 28 January 2007. Davina McCall returned as presenter, having presented both the regular edition and the celebrity edition of Big Brother since they first began. Eleven housemates entered on launch night, with an additional three being introduced two days later. The series was watched by an average of 4.6 million viewers, the third highest viewed series of the show to date. As with the previous regular series, it was broadcast in 16:9 aspect ratio, as opposed to 4:3 – the first series of Celebrity Big Brother to do so.

The series saw the return of Jade Goody, who had become a media celebrity after appearing on the third regular series of Big Brother in 2002, arriving with her boyfriend and her mother – marking the first time in any series of Big Brother UK where family members entered together. During its original broadcast, Celebrity Big Brother 5 had become the subject of an internationally publicised racism controversy. It attracted the largest number of complaints to the UK media regulator Ofcom about a Big Brother series and, as of 2018, the second highest number of complaints about any British television broadcast of all time (after Jerry Springer: The Opera). Viewer complaints and press attention concerned housemate Shilpa Shetty, and alleged that she was the subject of racist bullying from some of her fellow housemates, in particular Jade Goody, Danielle Lloyd and Jo O'Meara. As a result, a protest took place in India; tensions increased between the UK and Indian governments; and a diplomatic incident occurred. Following the broadcast of the series, Ofcom concluded that Celebrity Big Brother 5 had breached the Broadcasting Code, and statutory sanctions were placed on Channel 4.

Production

Eye logo
The eye logo for this series was the same yellow and black spiraled eye used for Big Brother 7. Two modifications were a black background, therefore camouflaging the black spiral in the eye, and making only the yellow spiral visible. A star also replaced the pupil to correspond with the celebrity series. The star also shone with a yellow glow.

Sponsorship
The Carphone Warehouse remained as sponsor of the series, however due to highly publicised controversy which surrounded the series, Carphone Warehouse subsequently ended their long running association with Big Brother.

Broadcasts
Davina McCall presented the main Channel 4 show, including the live launch, evictions, finale and any other live show where a twist would take place. Marcus Bentley narrated the nightly highlight shows.

Dermot O'Leary presented Celebrity Big Brother's Little Brother in a teatime slot weekdays and on Sunday lunchtime. He also presented Celebrity Big Brother's Big Brain, which was introduced during the previous non-celebrity series, it would not return for any subsequent series.

On E4, live coverage from the house once again dominated its daily and nightly schedule, E4 Music was once again rested during the series. Diary Room Uncut returned on Monday evenings and on Saturday night, straight after the Channel 4 show.

Russell Brand presented Celebrity Big Brother's Big Mouth, which was broadcast Sunday to Friday straight after the Channel 4 show. Although no announcement was made during the series, Brand announced his departure on 4 April 2007.

Live streaming also returned on the Official Channel 4 website and also on E4 at selected times.

House

The general layout of the House was largely untouched from the previous non-celebrity series. The living room and bedroom had no noticeable changes. There were several single beds in the same room, with one double bed, meaning that two housemates (Leo and Donny) had to share. The bathroom is much smaller than previous versions and the toilet and shower were no longer fitted with cameras. The dining room table was moved inside, and the kitchen fully equipped with modern conveniences. Outside the garden was a three-jet hot tub with a farmyard seating area. The bridge to Nowhere was still present, leading to a sitting area with heated seats and the topiary man. A workout area was situated just off the kitchen area. Inside the House there was also a fax machine built into the wall. On day 24 this was used to post viewers' questions to the housemates. Meanwhile, the Diary Room was identical to the previous summer's Big Brother, with an oversized gold chair and padded walls, the only change being the addition of yellow lights facing the walls.

House Next Door
The House Next Door was used again, and its interior was re-designed to resemble a Victorian style kitchen, with uncomfortable beds in the bedroom, for use in the master-and-servant task.

Housemates
Eleven housemates entered the House on Day 1, followed by three more housemates on Day 3. This was more than any other celebrity series at the time.

Carole Malone
Carole Malone is an English journalist and television presenter, who writes a column for the Sunday Mirror newspaper. She also presented the Sky One programme Guilty! from 1997 to 1999 and appeared as a regular panellist on The Wright Stuff. She entered the house on Day 1 and became the second housemate to be evicted on Day 10.

Cleo Rocos
Cleo Rocos is a Brazil-born actress, who co-starred alongside comedian Kenny Everett in The Kenny Everett Television Show. She entered the house on Day 1. She became the fifth housemate to be evicted on Day 24.

Danielle Lloyd
Danielle Lloyd is an English glamour model, who had her Miss Great Britain title revoked after appearing in the December 2006 edition of Playboy magazine. She entered the house on Day 1. During her time in the house, Lloyd was accused of alleged racist behaviour towards her fellow housemate Shilpa. She finished in fifth place on Day 26.

Dirk Benedict
Dirk Benedict is an American actor, most notable for his television roles as Lieutenant Starbuck in Battlestar Galactica and Lieutenant Templeton "Face" Peck in The A-Team. He entered the house on Day 1. He finished in third place on Day 26.

Donny Tourette
Donny Tourette is an English singer-songwriter, best known as a member of the punk rock band Towers of London. He entered the house on Day 1. He walked from the series on Day 3.

Ian "H" Watkins
Ian "H" Watkins is a Welsh singer and actor, best known as a member of the pop group Steps. He entered the house on Day 1. He finished in fourth place on Day 26.

Jack Tweed
Jack Tweed was the then-boyfriend of Jade Goody, who entered the house on Day 3. He finished in sixth place on Day 26. He married Goody in February 2009, just before her death in March 2009.

Jackiey Budden
Jackiey Budden was the mother of Jade Goody. Prior to her appearance on the series, she appeared on an episode of the Living TV show Extreme Makeover UK. She entered the house on Day 3 and became the first housemate to be evicted on Day 8.

Jade Goody
Jade Goody was an English reality television personality. She first appeared as a housemate on the third series of Big Brother in 2002, before starring in its one-off series Big Brother Panto and her own Sky Living reality shows including Just Jade. She entered the house on Day 3. During her time in the house, Goody was accused of racist behaviour towards her fellow housemate Shilpa. She became the third housemate to be evicted on Day 17. Goody died on 22 March 2009.

Jermaine Jackson
Jermaine Jackson is an American singer, songwriter and bass guitarist, who achieved international stardom as a member of the family band The Jackson 5. His solo releases "Let's Get Serious" and "Do What You Do" both reached the top 10 of the UK Singles Chart. He entered the house on Day 1. He finished as the runner-up on Day 26.

Jo O'Meara
Jo O'Meara is an English singer and songwriter, best known as a member of the pop group S Club 7. She entered the house on Day 1. During her time in the house, O'Meara was accused of alleged racist behaviour towards her fellow housemate Shilpa. She became the fourth housemate to be evicted on Day 24.

Ken Russell
Ken Russell was an English film director, whose credits included films such as Women in Love and Tommy. He entered the house on Day 1. He walked from the series on Day 5. Russell died on 27 November 2011.

Leo Sayer
Leo Sayer is an English-Australian singer-songwriter and musician, who rose to prominence in the 1970s with releases such as "You Make Me Feel Like Dancing" and "When I Need You". He entered the house on Day 1. He walked from the series on Day 10.

Shilpa Shetty
Shilpa Shetty is an Indian actress, primarily known for her roles in Main Khiladi Tu Anari Dhadkan. She made her Bollywood debut with the film Baazigar. She was also the judge of dance reality show Jhalak Dikhhla Jaa. She entered the house on Day 1. During her time in the house, Shetty was the subject of alleged racist behaviour from her fellow housemates Danielle, Jade and Jo. She won the series on Day 26.

Weekly summary

Nominations table

Notes

Voting fault
One event in this series was a technical fault that affected voting lines in the eviction between Cleo Rocos, Dirk Benedict, Ian Watkins, Jo O'Meara and Shilpa Shetty. Everyone who voted was offered a refund.  Any unclaimed money would be donated to charity.

Viewership
All viewing figures below are provided by the Broadcasters Audience Research Board (or "BARB").

Racism controversy

Celebrity Big Brother criticism focused around the treatment of housemate Shilpa Shetty by contestants Jade Goody, Jo O'Meara and Danielle Lloyd.
UK media regulator Ofcom received more than 44,500 complaints – a record number for a British television programme after transmission. Channel 4 received an additional 3,000 complaints, about racism and bullying by housemates against Shetty. The Eastern Eye newspaper launched an online petition that registered over 30,000 signatures. Channel 4, who had initially described the situation as "girly rivalry", later admitted there had "undoubtedly been a cultural clash between her and three of the British females in the house".

After an investigation by Ofcom, they concluded that Channel 4 had breached the Broadcasting Code on three separate occasions.

References

External links 
 Celebrity Big Brother at Channel4.com
 

2007 British television seasons
05